Paulo Estrela Moreira Alves (born 20 February 1999) is a Portuguese professional footballer who plays for Portimonense S.C. as a midfielder.

Club career

Porto
Estrela was born in Paços de Ferreira, Porto District. He joined FC Porto's academy at the age of 10.

On 7 March 2018, Estrela played his first match as a professional with the B team, coming on as a second-half substitute in a 6–0 away loss against C.D. Nacional in the LigaPro.

Portimonense
In June 2019, Estrela signed a three-year contract with Primeira Liga club Portimonense SC, being initially assigned to its under-23 team where he acted as captain. He only made his league debut on 16 April 2022, as a late substitute in the 7–0 defeat at former side Porto.

Estrela scored his first goal in the top division on 16 September 2022, the only in a win over G.D. Chaves through a penalty.

International career
Estrela represented Portugal at youth level. He scored his only goal on 25 March 2015, in a 5–0 victory over Azerbaijan in an under-16 friendly tournament.

References

External links

1999 births
Living people
People from Paços de Ferreira
Sportspeople from Porto District
Portuguese footballers
Association football midfielders
Primeira Liga players
Liga Portugal 2 players
Padroense F.C. players
FC Porto B players
Portimonense S.C. players
Portugal youth international footballers